The Hermux Tantamoq Adventures are a series of children's novels by Michael Hoeye which follows the story of a watchmaker mouse named Hermux Tantamoq, who becomes a detective. All of the books in the series include the word 'time' in the title.

Distribution

Books

 Time Stops for No Mouse
 The Sands of Time
 No Time Like Show Time
 Time to Smell the Roses

Audio
The first three books have been made into audiobooks and were narrated by Campbell Scott.

External links 
Hermux.com (official website)
Puffin Books - Michael Hoeye

References 

American children's novels
American fantasy novels
Children's fantasy novels
Children's mystery novels
Series of children's books
Fantasy novel series
Children's novels about animals